Rusyaidi Salime (born 25 April 1998) is a Singaporean footballer who plays as a midfielder for Singapore Premier League club Lion City Sailors.

Career 
Rusyaidi started his career with the NFA set up before moving to the development squad in 2016.

Since the start of 2017, he is the regular right back for the young lions.

He was named winner of The New Paper Dollah Kassim Award in 2016 after having nominated in 2014.

Career statistics 

. Caps and goals may not be correct.

References

External links 
 Rusyaidi Salime Interview
  on Facebook

1998 births
Living people
Singaporean footballers
Association football forwards
Young Lions FC players
Singapore Premier League players
Footballers at the 2010 Summer Youth Olympics
Competitors at the 2017 Southeast Asian Games
Southeast Asian Games competitors for Singapore